William Baker (3 October 1743 – 20 January 1824) was a British politician.

Life

William Baker was the eldest son of Sir William Baker, MP, educated at Eton College (1753–60). Admitted to Clare College, Cambridge in 1761, he did not matriculate there. He studied law at the Inner Temple (1761), where he was called to the bar in 1775. He succeeded his father in 1770, inheriting and renovating the Bayfordbury country house in Hertfordshire. He was elected a Sheriff of London for the same year.

Baker was the Member of Parliament for Aldborough 4 March 1777 – 8 September 1780, Hertford  7 September 1780 – 30 March 1784, Hertfordshire 23 June 1790 – 10 July 1802 and 11 February 1805 – 11 May 1807 and Plympton Erle 22 March 1768 – 10 October 1774.

He died at the age of 80. He had married twice: firstly with Juliana, the daughter of Thomas Penn of Stoke Park, Buckinghamshire and the granddaughter of William Penn, Governor of Pennsylvania, with whom he had a daughter; and secondly with Sophia, the daughter of John Conyers of Copt Hall, Essex, with whom he had 9 sons and 6 daughters.

References
historyofparliamentonline.org, Baker, William (1743-1824), of Bayfordbury, Herts.

Notes

1743 births
1824 deaths
People educated at Eton College
Alumni of Clare College, Cambridge
Members of the Inner Temple
Sheriffs of the City of London
Members of the Parliament of Great Britain for Hertfordshire
British MPs 1768–1774
British MPs 1774–1780
British MPs 1780–1784
British MPs 1790–1796
British MPs 1796–1800
Members of the Parliament of the United Kingdom for Hertfordshire
UK MPs 1801–1802
UK MPs 1802–1806
UK MPs 1806–1807
Members of the Parliament of Great Britain for Plympton Erle